The Bishop of Croydon is an episcopal title used by an area bishop of the Church of England Diocese of Southwark, in the Province of Canterbury, England.  The Croydon Archdeaconry was transferred from Canterbury Diocese to Southwark in 1984.

The bishops suffragan of Croydon have been area bishops since the Southwark area scheme was founded in 1991. The Bishop of Croydon oversees the Episcopal Area of Croydon, which is made up of the Archdeaconries of Croydon and Reigate. The Archdeaconry of Croydon comprises the Deaneries of Croydon Addington (nine parishes), Croydon Central (10 parishes), Croydon North (12 parishes), Croydon South (10 parishes) and Sutton (14 parishes). The Archdeaconry of Reigate comprises the Deaneries of Caterham (nine parishes), Godstone (14 parishes) and Reigate (24 parishes), extending as far as Gatwick Airport and Banstead.

The Episcopal area was historically in the Diocese of Canterbury, as the Archbishop of Canterbury lived at Croydon Palace and Addington Palace when he did not live at Lambeth Palace or other episcopal residences, from their medieval construction until the 19th century.

List of the bishops

References

External links
 Crockford's Clerical Directory – Listings

 
Anglican suffragan bishops in the Diocese of Southwark